Ivan Eugen Padovec (17 July 1800 – 4 November 1873), commonly known as Johann (Ivan) Padowetz (see the signature on the photo), born in the baroque town of Varaždin in Croatia (known for its festivals of baroque music), was a guitar virtuoso, who gave concerts in Zagreb, Vienna, Prague, Budapest, Hamburg, London, etc. He constructed a ten-string guitar. Also, his Theoretisch-praktische Guitarrschule was published by Werner & Comp. in Vienna around 1844.

List of works

Orchestral compositions
 Premier Concertino in C-major, for guitar and strings
 Allegro moderato
 Andante
 Rondo. Allegretto
 Second Concertino in F-major, for guitar and strings
 Allegro moderato
 Andante sostenuto
 Polacca
 Introduction und Variationen über ein Thema aus der Oper 'Die Kreuzritter' for guitar and orchestra consisted of a string quintet, two flutes, two oboes, two clarinets, two bassoons, French horn, trumpet and timpani

Compositions for two guitars
Among Padowetz's five guitar duets, four of them (op.3, op.10 and op.18) require one terz-guitar. 
 Der Carneval von Venedig mit concertanten Variationen, Op.62
 Deux polonaises Op.3
 Polonaise Op.3 No.1
 Polonaise Op.3 No.2
 Premier grand rondeau Op.10
 Première grande polonaise Op.18

Compositions for solo guitar
Padowetz composed a large amount of guitar solos: numerous demanding works in forms of variations and fantasias mainly on operatic themes (most of them published in Vienna and some in Paris), but also a lot of short and easy pieces which mainly remained in manuscripts.

 Moderato
 Mazurka
 Rondoletto Op.53
 6 Easy Pieces Op.6
 Marsch
 Monferino
 Thema
 Polonaise
 Ungarischer
 (untitled)
 Introduction et variations sur un air national hongrois Op.9
 Introduction et variations sur un thême favoris de l'opera (Donizetti's Lucrezia Borgia) Op.61
 Introduction und Variationen für die Guitare über die beliebte Cavatine (L'amo ah l'amo e m'e pio cara, from Bellini's opera Montechi u. Capuleti) Op.13
 Variations brillantes Op.2
 Variations pour la guitare sur l'air (Quant je quittai la Normandie = Eh ich die Normandie verlassen, from Giacomo Meyerbeer's opera Robert le diable) Op.25
 Variations sur la valse favorite de Franz Schubert Op.4
 Introduction & Variations (on a theme from Bellini's Sonnambula) Op.52
 Fantasy Op.23
 Variations Op.1
 Introduction & Variations Op.14
 Variations Op.16

CD Recordings
 Variations sur in valse favorit de Fr. Schubert, Op. 4, performed by Karl Michelson (Sapere Aude Record, CD, 2021)
 Musings (Duo Erato (Martha Masters & Risa Carlson))
 Ivan Padovec - Joyful music for guitar (Darko Petrinjak & Maroje Brčić) link
 Ivan Eugen Padovec: The Longing (Aulos Varaždin) link
 Ivan Padovec – Chaplet of Songs (Aulos Varaždin) link
 Ivan Padovec 2000 (Aulos Varaždin) link
  Ivan Padovec - Work for soprano and guitar 2015 (Dominika Zamara sopran, Stanley Alexandrowicz)

External links
 
 List of compositions by Ivan Padovec
 extensive monograph of Ivan Padovec, written by Josip Bažant
 old sheet music and few handwritings on Europeana
 Johann Padowetz Collection
 Zwei Concertini von Johann Padowetz (Ivan Padovec) für Terzgitarre und Streicher. Zur Wiederentdeckung der verschollenen Werke (HACKL_103_112.pdf)
 FREE SHEET MUSIC - Padowetz, Johann
 Free sheet music of Johann Padowetz
 Johann Padowetz: Concert Variations on 'The Carnival of Venice' (Editions ORPHÉE)
 Padovec: Second Concertino
 publication (with Stefan Hackl and Gerhard Penn) of two Concertinos for terz guitar and string orchestra by Johann Padowetz
 Ivan Padovec redivivus 
 Ivan Padovec, hrvatski gitarist europskog ugleda 
 

People from Varaždin
1800 births
1873 deaths
Composers for the classical guitar
Croatian classical guitarists
History of Varaždin
19th-century guitarists